Comanche Point is a  summit located in the Grand Canyon, in Coconino County of northern Arizona, US. Part of the Palisades of the Desert, Comanche Point is the high point on the canyon's less-visited East Rim, and is four miles north-northeast of Desert View Point, its nearest higher neighbor. Comanche Point was named in 1900 by George Wharton James for the Comanche, a Native-American nation from the Great Plains, in keeping with a practice of naming the points on the canyon's South Rim for Native American nations. This geographical feature's name was officially adopted in 1906 by the U.S. Board on Geographic Names. According to the Köppen climate classification system, Comanche Point is located in a Cold semi-arid climate zone. On September 27, 1994, the tabloid Weekly World News ran an outlandish cover story that wreckage of a 4000-year-old UFO had been found in limestone rubble near the base of Comanche Point.

Geology

The summit of Comanche Point is composed of Kaibab Limestone overlaying cream-colored, cliff-forming, Permian Coconino Sandstone. The sandstone, which is the third-youngest of the strata in the Grand Canyon, was deposited 265 million years ago as sand dunes. Below the Coconino Sandstone is slope-forming, Permian Hermit Formation, which in turn overlays the Pennsylvanian-Permian Supai Group. Further down are strata of Mississippian Redwall Limestone, and Cambrian Tonto Group. Precipitation runoff from Comanche Point drains into the nearby Colorado River.

Gallery

See also
 Geology of the Grand Canyon area

References

External links 

 Weather forecast: National Weather Service
 Comanche Point rock climbing: Mountainproject.com
 4000-year-old UFO found near Comanche Point: Weekly World News

Grand Canyon
Landforms of Coconino County, Arizona
Mountains of Arizona
Mountains of Coconino County, Arizona
Colorado Plateau
Grand Canyon National Park
North American 2000 m summits